This is a list of public welfare organisations based in Malaysia under the administration of Department of Social Welfare, Ministry of Women, Family and Community Development.

Children's Home
Children's Home (Rumah Kanak-kanak) was established under Section 54, Child Act 2001.
Rumah Kanak-kanak Taman Bakti, Kepala Batas, Pulau Pinang
Rumah Kanak-kanak Sultan Abd Aziz, Kuala Kangsar, Perak
Rumah Kanak-kanak Tengku Budriah, Cheras, Kuala Lumpur
Rumah Kanak-kanak Tengku Ampuan Fatimah, Kuantan, Pahang
Rumah Budak Laki-laki Tun Abdul Aziz, Durian Daun, Melaka
Pusat Perkembangan Kemahiran Kebangsaan Serendah, Selangor
Rumah Kanak-kanak Kota Kinabalu, Sabah
Rumah Kanak-kanak Arau, Perlis
Rumah Kanak-kanak Kuching, Sarawak
Rumah Kanak-kanak Rembau, Negeri Sembilan
Rumah Kanak-kanak Sultanah Hajjah Kalsom, Kuantan, Pahang
Rumah Kanak-kanak Mini Kelantan
Rumah Kanak-kanak Mini Johor

Tunas Harapan Home
Rumah Tunas Harapan Tengku Ampuan Rahimah, Kuala Selangor, Selangor
Rumah Tunas Harapan Payung Sejahtera, Kuala Pilah, Negeri Sembilan
Rumah Tunas Harapan Darul Hilmi, Kuala Terengganu, Terengganu
Rumah Tunas Harapan Semarak Kasih, Jasin, Melaka	
Rumah Tunas Harapan Taman Kemumin, Kelantan
Rumah Tunas Harapan Kompleks Penyayang Bakti, Sungai Buloh, Selangor
Rumah Tunas Harapan Semai Bakti, Pahang	
Rumah Tunas Harapan Sepenuh Hati, Rawang, Selangor	
Rumah Tunas Harapan Sepenuh Hati 2, Seri Kembangan, Selangor

Rumah Perlindungan ATIP
Rumah Perlindungan Rembau, Negeri Sembilan (all-girls)
Rumah Perlindungan Bukit Senyum, Johor (all-boys)

Probation Hostel
Probation Hostel (Asrama Akhlak) was established under the Section 61, Child Act 2001.

All-boys
Asrama Akhlak Pokok Sena, Kedah
Asrama Akhlak Selibin, Ipoh, Perak
Asrama Akhlak Paya Terubong, Ayer Itam, Penang
Asrama Sentosa, Kuala Lumpur
Asrama Akhlak Bukit Baru, Melaka
Asrama Akhlak Lelaki Kempas, Johor Bahru, Johor
Asrama Akhlak Rusila, Kuala Terengganu, Terengganu
Asrama Akhlak Kuching, Kota Samarahan, Sarawak

All-girls
Asrama Akhlak (P) Jitra, Kedah
Asrama Bahagia Kampung Pandan, Kuala Lumpur

Tunas Bakti School
Tunas Bakti School (Sekolah Tunas Bakti) was established under the Section 65, Child Act 2001.
Sekolah Tunas Bakti Telok Air Tawar, Butterworth, Penang
Sekolah Tunas Bakti Marang, Terengganu
Sekolah Tunas Bakti, Sungai Lereh, Melaka
Sekolah Tunas Bakti Sungai Besi, Kuala Lumpur
Sekolah Tunas Bakti Taiping, Perak
Sekolah Tunas Bakti, Kuching, Sarawak
Sekolah Tunas Bakti Kota Kinabalu, Sabah

Taman Seri Puteri
Taman Seri Puteri was established under the Section 55, Child Act 2001.
Taman Seri Puteri Batu Gajah, Perak
Taman Seri Puteri Cheras, Selangor
Taman Seri Puteri Kota Kinabalu, Sabah
Taman Seri Puteri Kuching, Sarawak

Desa Bina Diri
Desa Bina Diri Mersing, Johor
Desa Bina Diri Jerantut, Pahang
Desa Bina Diri Kuching, Sarawak
Desa Bina Diri Kota Kinabalu, Sabah
Pusat Sehenti Bina Diri Sungai Buloh, Selangor

Rumah Ehsan
Rumah Ehsan Dungun, Terengganu
Rumah Ehsan Kuala Kubu Bahru, Selangor

Rumah Seri Kenangan
Rumah Seri Kenangan Kangar, Perlis
Rumah Seri Kenangan Taiping, Perak
Rumah Seri Kenangan Kinta, Perak
Rumah Seri Kenangan Cheras, Selangor
Rumah Seri Kenangan Seremban, Negeri Sembilan
Rumah Seri Kenangan Cheng, Melaka
Rumah Seri Kenangan Johor Bahru, Johor
Rumah Seri Kenangan Kemumin, Kelantan
Rumah Seri Kenangan Bedong, Kedah

Taman Sinar Harapan
Taman Sinar Harapan Kuala Terengganu, Terengganu
Taman Sinar Harapan Cheras, Selangor
Taman Sinar Harapan Tuanku Ampuan Najihah, Seremban, Negeri Sembilan
Taman Sinar Harapan Tampoi, Johor Bahru, Johor
Taman Sinar Harapan Jubli, Johor Bahru, Johor	
Taman Sinar Harapan Kuala Kubu Bharu, Selangor
Taman Sinar Harapan Jitra, Kedah

References

Welfare in Malaysia
Youth in Malaysia
Vocational colleges in Malaysia
Welfare
Malaysian children
Old age in Malaysia
Poverty in Malaysia
Homelessness in Malaysia